Mary Tracy may refer to:
 Mary Ellen Tracy, high priestess of the Church of the Most High Goddess
 Mary Lee Tracy, American gymnastics coach